Bagwada  is a small town station on the Western Railway network in the state of Gujarat, India. Bagwada railway station is 20 km away from Valsad railway station. This village was developed by Chhatrapati Shivaji Maharaj.This village is surrounded with old temples and has a small fort on the hill top of Arjungadh

Trains

 69149/50 Virar–Bharuch MEMU
 69141/42 Sanjan–Surat MEMU
 59439/40 Mumbai Central–Ahmedabad Passenger

References

See also
 Valsad district

Railway stations in Valsad district
Mumbai WR railway division